Solidago arenicola  is a rare species of flowering plant in the family Asteraceae known by the common name Locust Fork goldenrod (after the type locality which is alongside the Locust Fork River in Blount County, Alabama). It has been found only in the states of Tennessee and Alabama in the United States. It is endemic to riverside scour areas on the Cumberland Plateau, where it is often locally abundant.

Solidago arenicola is a perennial herb up to 80 cm (32 inches) tall, with a woody underground rhizome. Leaves are up to 15 cm (8 inches) long, mostly on the lower part of the stem. One plant can produce up to 50 yellow flower heads on the upper branches.

References

External links
Photo of herbarium specimen at Missouri Botanical Garden, collected in Alabama in 2002. isotype of Solidago arenicola

arenicola
Flora of Tennessee
Plants described in 2003
Flora of Alabama